Darrylia harryleei is a species of sea snail, a marine gastropod mollusk in the family Horaiclavidae.

It was previously included within the subfamily Crassispirinae, Turridae.

Description
The length of the shell varies between 5.9 mm and 7.7 mm.

Distribution
This marine species occurs in the Caribbean Sea off Honduras.

References

External links
 E.F. Garcia, Eight new molluscan species (Gastropoda, Turridae) from the Western Atlantic with the description of two new genera; Novapex vol. 9 (2008)

harryleei